The Harvard Crimson women's basketball team is the intercollegiate women's basketball program representing Harvard University. The school competes in the Ivy League in Division I of the National Collegiate Athletic Association (NCAA). The Crimson play home basketball games at the Lavietes Pavilion in Boston, Massachusetts near the university campus.  They are the first team in NCAA basketball history to win in national tournament play as a #16 seed against a #1 seed.

History
Harvard has won the Ivy League eleven times, with four shared (1986, 1988, 2005, and 2008) and seven won outright (1991, 1996, 1997, 1998, 2002, 2003, and 2007). Harvard has lost twice in a playoff to determine the automatic bid to the NCAA Tournament, losing 75–61 to Dartmouth in 2005 and losing to Dartmouth 68–62 in 2008.

Postseason appearances
The Crimson have reached the NCAA Tournament six times (1996, 1997, 1998, 2002, 2003, and 2007), with one postseason win in 1998 over Stanford 71–67. To date, this is the only time a #16 seed has beaten a #1 seed in women's NCAA Tournament history (In men's basketball, the UMBC Retrievers became the first to do so, 20 years later). The historic win sent them into the Second Round (only reached one other time in Ivy League history), where they lost 82–64 to Arkansas.

References

External links